Leonida is a given name and a surname.

Leonida may also refer to:

Leonida, designer and manufacturer of Romanian tank destroyers TACAM R-2
Leonida, fictional planet in the Noon Universe by Russian science fiction writers Strugatsky brothers

See also

Leonidas (disambiguation)